KNLA may refer to:

 Karen National Liberation Army
 KNLA-CD
 KNLA, a full-power television station (channel 44, virtual 64) licensed to Santa Monica, California, United States